Daikiya Group is a restaurant chain based in Hong Kong which focuses on Japanese-style buffets. The company was founded in 2010 and filed for its initial public offering in June 2019. The company is the largest Japanese-style buffet chain in Hong Kong, operating 13 branches and having a market share of 37.1% as of 2019. According to its IPO filing to the Hong Kong Stock Exchange, the company had an adjusted profit margin of 11.8% in 2018, higher than other restaurant chains in Hong Kong such as Fairwood and Café de Coral.

References

Restaurant chains in Hong Kong
Hong Kong brands
Restaurants established in 2010
2010 establishments in Hong Kong